Sir Barry Trevor Jackson FRCS FRCP FRCSGlas (born July 1936), is a British surgeon, who, between 1991 and 2001, was Serjeant Surgeon to The Queen, and president of the Royal College of Surgeons from 1998 to 2001. He was made a Knight Bachelor in the 2001 New Year Honours, "for services to training and education in surgery".

He served as president of the Royal Society of Medicine from 2002 to 2004. Previously he was a gastrointestinal surgeon at St Thomas' Hospital, London, for over 30 years.

References 

1936 births
Living people
British surgeons
Fellows of the Royal College of Surgeons
Fellows of the Royal College of Physicians
Presidents of the Royal Society of Medicine
Fellows of King's College London